Vermicelli (also) is a traditional type of pasta round in section similar to spaghetti. In English-speaking regions it is usually thinner than spaghetti, while in Italy it is typically thicker.

The term vermicelli is also used to describe various types of thin noodles from Asia.  In Vietnam vermicelli is the same as angel hair pasta or capellini.

Thickness comparison

As defined in Italy:

In the United States, the National Pasta Association (which has no links with its Italian counterpart, the Unione Industriali Pastai Italiani) lists vermicelli as a thinner type of spaghetti.

The Code of Federal Regulations of the United States of America defines "spaghetti" and "vermicelli" by diameter:

History

In 14th-century Italy, long pasta shapes had varying local names. Barnabas de Reatinis of Reggio notes in his Compendium de naturis et proprietatibus alimentorum (1338) that the Tuscan vermicelli are called orati in Bologna, minutelli in Venice, fermentini in Reggio, and pancardelle in Mantua.

The first mention of a vermicelli recipe is in the book De arte Coquinaria per vermicelli e maccaroni siciliani (The Art of Cooking Sicilian Macaroni and Vermicelli), compiled by the famous Maestro Martino da Como, unequalled in his field at the time and perhaps the first "celebrity chef", who was the chef at the Roman palazzo of the papal chamberlain ("camerlengo"), the Patriarch of Aquileia.  In Martino's Libro de arte coquinaria, there are several recipes for vermicelli, which can last two or three years (doi o tre anni) when dried in the sun.

Vermicelli in other countries

Middle East and East Africa 
Vermicelli, called shaʿīriyya (شعيرية) in Arabic, is used in one of the most common ways of cooking rice in Egypt and the Levant. The vermicelli is browned by frying with oil or butter, then rice and water are added.

In Somalia, it is used in a sweet dish called cadriyad, originating from the Yemeni ʿaṭriyah (عطرية). The vermicelli is browned by frying with butter, then water, sugar and cardamom are added until it has softened slightly. The dish is similar to the Indian Sheer khurma. However, no milk or cream is added. Bananas can also be added on top. It is usually eaten as a dessert or as a side-dish with Somali spiced rice dishes.

Cadriyad is also a common dessert in certain parts of Ethiopia, particularly in the Arab-influenced Harar-ghe region, where it is known as attriya and is served cold, often with a thin layer of custard on top.

Iberia 

Possibly due to the Umayyad influence, Spain and Portugal use a type of vermicelli called aletria. It is mostly used for soups or desserts. In modern-day Portugal, aletria usually refers to a dessert similar to a rice pudding, but replacing the rice with aletria.

The Americas 

The fideo is a type of noodle, produced in Europe since medieval times, best known as fideus or fidelis, which spread to Mexican and Latin American cuisine, and is often referred to by speakers of English as "vermicelli."  It is commonly used in chicken soup and in sopa seca, a type of side dish.

Indian subcontinent 

In countries of the Indian subcontinent, vermicelli is available either as long strands or cut into about 2 cm long pieces. Vermicelli is known by various local names such as, Sewiyun in Sindhi, Semya in Telugu, sémiya when made with wheat & sevai when made with rice in Tamil, Semiya in Malayalam, shavige in Kannada, shemai in Bengali, seviyan in Hindi, Urdu and Punjabi, shevaya in Marathi, simei in Odia, sev in Gujarati, semige in Tulu. The noodles are used in a number of dishes including a variation of kheer, a sweet dessert similar to rice pudding. Vermicelli are also used in many parts of India to make a popular dish called upma. To prepare it, dry oil-roasted vermicelli and pre-sauteed vegetables such as onions, carrots, French-beans, peas etc. are cooked together with enough water that can be absorbed by the vermicelli. Roasted cashew or peanuts are used as garnish.

Other noodles called vermicelli 
In English, the Italian loanword "vermicelli" is used to indicate different sorts of long pasta shapes from different parts of the world but mostly from South or East Asia.

Central Asian Kesme and Persian reshteh also resemble vermicelli. Fālūde or faloodeh is a Persian frozen dessert made with thin vermicelli noodles frozen with corn starch, rose water, lime juice, and often ground pistachios.

In East and Southeast Asia, the term vermicelli is used to translate four different types of noodles. Rice vermicelli can refer to a thin dried type of rice noodle (Chinese: 米粉, pinyin: mǐfěn; Hokkien: bee hoon; Cantonese: mai fun; Thai: sen mi เส้นหมี่; Burmese: kya zan ). A second type of vermicelli is made from rice that has been fermented (Chinese: 米線; pinyin: mǐxiàn; Thai: khanom chin ขนมจีน; Vietnamese: bún). The latter are normally eaten fresh, rather than after drying. Thirdly, vermicelli sometimes indicates cellophane noodles made from mung bean or sweet potato flour (traditional Chinese: 粉絲, pinyin: fěnsī; Thai: wun sen วุ้นเส้น). Cellophane noodles turn translucent after cooking, whereas rice vermicelli remain opaque. The fourth type of vermicelli are made from wheat rather than rice flour, misua.

See also
Rice vermicelli
Chinese vermicelli

References

Cuisine of Campania
Types of pasta
Sindhi cuisine
Pakistani cuisine
Indian cuisine